Agios Spyridonas (Greek meaning Saint Spyridon) may refer to the following places in Greece:

Agios Spyridonas, Boeotia, a village in Boeotia
Agios Spyridonas, Corfu, a beach and nature reserve in Corfu
Agios Spyridonas, Phocis, a village in Phocis 
Agios Spyridonas, Pieria, a village in Pieria
Agios Spiridonas (Limassol), a district of the Municipality of Limassol